Jack Somack (September 1, 1918 – August 24, 1983) was an American chemical engineer, and actor. He is best remembered for his appearance in the Alka-Seltzer "spicy meatball" television commercial.

Life and career 
Somack was born in Chicago, Illinois. He began his acting career in 1966, playing the lead role of Eddie Carbone in Arthur Miller's A View From the Bridge.

In 1971 Somack appeared in the Alka-Seltzer "spicy meatball" commercial.
He also appeared in the Broadway plays Paris Is Out! and The Prisoner of Second Avenue. 

In the 1970s and 1980s Somack appeared and guest-starred in film and television programs including Barney Miller, The Rockford Files, Portnoy's Complaint, Sanford and Son, All in the Family, The Love Boat, Desperate Characters, Laverne & Shirley, The Frisco Kid, Eight Is Enough, The Pursuit of Happiness, Starsky & Hutch, Hero at Large, Kojak, The Main Event, The Jimmy Stewart Show, The Blue Knight and Family Ties. He also starred in the short-lived television series Ball Four and The Stockard Channing Show.

Death 
Somack died in August 1983 of a heart attack at the Hollywood Presbyterian Hospital in Los Angeles, at the age of 64. He had been rehearsing for a role in the television series Benson.

Filmography

Film

Television

References

External links 

Rotten Tomatoes profile

1918 births
1983 deaths
People from Chicago
American male stage actors
American male film actors
American male television actors
20th-century American male actors
American theatre people
American chemical engineers
Male actors from Chicago